Penstemon californicus is a species of penstemon known by the common name California penstemon. It is native to Baja California and is also known from fewer than 20 occurrences in California, mainly in Orange and Riverside Counties. It grows in the forest and woodland habitat of the Peninsular Ranges and nearby slopes. This is a perennial herb with many spreading or upright branches 30 centimeters in maximum height. The leaves are no more than 1.5 centimeters long with linear or lance-shaped blades borne on petioles. The inflorescence produces tubular flowers between 1 and 2 centimeters long, purple to blue in color with dark-striped white throats containing hairy staminodes.

External links

californicus
Flora of California
Flora of Baja California
Flora of the United States
Flora without expected TNC conservation status